Cơm bình dân is a Vietnamese meal consisting of rice and a selection of side dishes typical in Vietnamese cuisine. The term literally means "commoner's rice" in Vietnamese. It is often found in restaurants and street vendors throughout Vietnam.

The meal almost always consists of a large helping of rice, boiled or pickle vegetables, soup, and some choices of meat. Possible side dishes may include pork, beef, chicken, eggs, fish, grains, vegetables, tofu, soups, broths, etc. It is often eaten with chopsticks and a spoon.

As the name suggests, cơm bình dân is typically inexpensive, making it affordable for the common Vietnamese.

References

Vietnamese rice dishes
Street food in Vietnam